, also titled Love Betrayed, is a 1973 Japanese drama film written and directed by Kaneto Shindō. It is based on the 1914 novel Kokoro by Natsume Sōseki.

Cast
 Noboru Matsuhashi as K
 Kazunaga Tsuji as S
 Nobuko Otowa as Mrs. M.
 Anri as I-ko
 Taiji Tonoyama as Father of S
 Yasuo Arakawa as Boy
 Sotomi Kotake as Girl

Literary source
Sōseki's novel has been adapted for film and television numerous times, the first time for cinema by Kon Ichikawa in 1955 as The Heart. For his version, writer/director Shindō moved the story's Meiji era setting to the 1970s and put his focus only on the novel's third and final part, "Sensei to isho" ("Sensei's testament").

Reception
While Louis Frédéric ranked The Heart among Shindō's important films, Max Tessier criticised Shindō's "leaden directing" and "heavy-handed psychology".

References

External links
 

1973 films
1973 drama films
Japanese drama films
Films directed by Kaneto Shindo
Films based on Japanese novels
1970s Japanese films